Segue 3 is a faint star cluster of the Milky Way galaxy discovered in 2010 in the data obtained by Sloan Digital Sky Survey.

Its small radius—of about 2.1 pc—is typical for the galactic globular clusters. The cluster has a slightly flattened shape and shows some evidence of the tidal disruption.

These stars are more than 12 billion year old. Segue 3 appears to be one of the faintest globular clusters of the Milky Way.

References

Milky Way
Globular clusters
?